Sunol may refer to:

 Sunol, California
 Sunol-Midtown, California
 Sunol, Nebraska
 Sunol Regional Wilderness, Alameda County, California